Xá-Muteba (Portuguese spelling) or Shah-Muteba (Bantu spelling) is a town and municipality in Lunda Norte Province in Angola. The municipality had a population of 68,114 in 2014.

References

Populated places in Lunda Norte Province
Municipalities of Angola